HD 183143 (HT Sagittae) is a blue hypergiant star located in the constellation of Sagitta.

This star has an apparent magnitude of 6.9, meaning that can be seen with the naked eye under very dark skies and that is an easy target for binoculars or a small telescope.

Observations
HD 183143 was included in the first catalogue of Be stars, with distinct Hα emission lines. When emission lines in hot supergiant stars were investigated as indicators of expanding atmospheres and mass loss, HD 183143 was found to have Hα lines with P Cygni profiles, but indications of only modest mass loss. Modern high-resolution spectra show emission in lines from Hα, Hβ, Hγ, and Hδ, formed by the strong stellar wind.

The introduction of spectral standards for supergiants gave HD 183143 as the standard star for the class B7Ia. The spectral type is sometimes given as B7Iae to indicate the presence of the emission lines.

HD 183143 was listed as being variable in 1976, with a very small amplitude. During the Hipparcos mission, its brightness was observed to vary between magnitude 6.71 and 6.95. ASAS-3 photometry shows a period of 40.44 days. HD 183143 was formally announced as a variable star, probably of the α Cygni type, in 1979 and given the variable star designation HT Sagittae.

HD 183143 has been extensively studied because of the diffuse interstellar bands visible in its spectrum. The strongest lines are caused by interstellar atomic iron, potassium, lithium, sodium, and calcium, as well as ionised calcium, and CH and CN molecules. Infrared bands of ionised buckminsterfullerene have also been found in its spectrum. HD 183143 has been proposed as a reference standard for interstellar polarisation. It shows 6% polarisation.

A 2004 study reclassified the spectral type of HD 183143 as B6.8 Ia-0, a hypergiant. The parallax from the original Hipparcos catalogue was 2.70 mas, indicating a distance around 370 pc, but the revised Hipparcos parallax and the Gaia Data Release 3 parallax both indicate distances around 2,000 pc. Comparison of the space velocity and interstellar spectral lines produce a similar distance, with the star lying between the Orion-Cygnus Arm and the Carina–Sagittarius Arm.

References 

Sagitta (constellation)
Sagittae, HT
Durchmusterung objects
183143
095657
B-type hypergiants
Alpha Cygni variables